The Scotland national football team has appeared eight times at the FIFA World Cup, including five consecutive tournaments from 1974 to 1990. The team has never advanced beyond the first round of the finals competition. They have missed out on progressing to the second round three times on goal difference: in 1974, when Brazil edged them out; in 1978, when the Netherlands progressed; and in 1982, when the Soviets qualified.

Background
The Scottish Football Association (SFA) is the second oldest in the world; it was founded in 1873, the year after the first official international match was played between Scotland and England at Hamilton Crescent, Glasgow.

The FIFA World Cup is an international association football competition contested by the men's national teams of the members of the Fédération Internationale de Football Association (FIFA), the sport's global governing body. The competition has been held every four years since the first tournament in 1930, except in 1942 and 1946, due to World War II.

The World Cup consists of two parts, the qualification phase and the final phase (officially called the World Cup Finals). The qualification phase, which currently take place over the three years preceding the Finals, is used to determine which teams qualify for the Finals. The current format of the Finals involves 32 teams competing at venues within the host nation (or nations) over a period of about a month. The World Cup Finals is the most widely viewed sporting event in the world, with an estimated 715.1 million people watching the 2006 tournament final.

History

1930s
Scotland did not compete in the first three World Cup competitions, in 1930, 1934 and 1938. Because of a dispute with FIFA over "broken-time" payments to players, the SFA, with the football associations of England, Ireland and Wales, withdrew from FIFA in 1928, and did not rejoin as a permanent member until 1946.

1950s
The readmission of the Scottish Football Association to FIFA in 1946 meant that Scotland were now eligible to enter the 1950 FIFA World Cup. FIFA advised that places would be awarded to the top two teams in the 1949–50 British Home Championship, but the SFA announced that Scotland would attend the finals only if Scotland won the competition. Scotland won their first two matches, but a 1–0 home defeat by England meant that the Scots finished as runners-up. The SFA stood by this proclamation, despite pleas to the contrary by the Scotland players, supported by England captain Billy Wright and the other England players. Sportswriter Brian Glanville later described the SFA as showing "baffling insularity and pique" in their refusal to send a team to the World Cup.

The same qualification rules as in 1950 were in place for the 1954 FIFA World Cup, with the 1953–54 British Home Championship acting as a qualifying group. Scotland again finished second, but this time the SFA allowed a team to participate in the Finals, held in Switzerland. To quote the SFA website, "The preparation was atrocious". The SFA only sent 13 players to the finals, even though FIFA allowed 22-man squads at the tournament. Despite this self-imposed hardship in terms of players, the SFA dignitaries travelled in numbers, accompanied with their wives. Scotland lost 1–0 against Austria in their first game in the finals. After falling out with the SFA, probably due to the poor preparation of the team, manager Andy Beattie resigned hours before the game against Uruguay. Uruguay were reigning champions and had never before lost a game at the World Cup finals. The gulf in class was exposed in horrific fashion as Uruguay won 7–0.

Scotland qualified for the 1958 FIFA World Cup, finishing ahead of Spain. Manchester United manager Matt Busby had been due to manage the Scotland team at the World Cup, but the severe injuries he suffered in the Munich air disaster in February meant that trainer Dawson Walker took charge of the team instead. In their first match at the finals Scotland achieved a creditable draw against Yugoslavia. Players Archie Robertson and Tommy Docherty were sent to watch next opponents Paraguay and they reported back that Paraguay was a "rough, fit and good" team. Walker chose to ignore this advice and left out some of his combative players, including Docherty, and Scotland lost 3–2. They exited the competition after also losing to France.

1960s
Scotland failed to qualify for another World Cup in the next 16 years. In the 1962 competition, a "skilful but fragile" team finished joint-top of UEFA qualification group 8 with Czechoslovakia. This meant that the teams had to play-off in a neutral venue for the qualification place, which the Czechs won 4–2 after extra time.

Jock Stein was appointed manager on a part-time basis ahead of 1966 FIFA World Cup qualification. Scotland were drawn with Italy, Poland and Finland in UEFA qualification group 8. Scotland got off to a good start with two wins against Finland and a draw in Poland, but then conceded two late goals to lose 2–1 to Poland at home. A 1–0 home win against Italy kept hopes alive going into the final game, where Scotland either needed to win in Italy to qualify or draw to force another play-off. Several first choice players withdrew due to injury; Scotland lost 3–0 and failed to qualify. Stein relinquished the Scotland job after this defeat to concentrate on his full-time role with Celtic.

1970s

Now managed by Bobby Brown, Scotland were drawn with West Germany, Austria and Cyprus in their 1970 qualification group. Scotland started well, beating Austria at home and scoring 13 goals in the two matches against Cyprus. A draw at home with West Germany meant that Scotland needed to avoid defeat in the return game to retain any hope of qualification. Scotland scored first in Hamburg, and then equalised midway through the second half, but succumbed to a 3–2 defeat. 
 
Willie Ormond was appointed Scotland manager in 1973. Ormond lost his first match in charge 5–0 to England, but recovered to steer Scotland to the 1974 World Cup finals in West Germany. Scotland then achieved their most impressive performance at a World Cup tournament, as the team was unbeaten but failed to progress beyond the group stages on goal difference. After beating Zaire, they drew with both Brazil and Yugoslavia, and went out because they had beaten Zaire by the smallest margin. This performance has been assessed as a "gallant failure", but the choice to retain possession instead of pressing for more goals against Zaire has been criticised.	

Scotland appointed Ally MacLeod as manager in 1977.  Scotland qualified for the 1978 FIFA World Cup with victories over Czechoslovakia and Wales. During the build-up to the tournament, MacLeod fuelled the hopes of the nation by stating that Scotland would come home from Argentina with a medal. As the squad left for the finals, they were given an enthusiastic send off as they were paraded around a packed Hampden Park. Thousands more fans lined the route to Prestwick Airport as the team set off for South America. This enthusiasm was not just generated internally, as respected coaches such as Rinus Michels and Miljan Miljanić rated Scotland amongst the favourites to win the competition. The Royal Mail commissioned designs of commemorative stamps that would have been circulated if Scotland had won the World Cup.

Scotland's first game was against Peru in Córdoba. Two spectacular goals by Teófilo Cubillas meant that the result was a 3–1 loss. The second game was a very disappointing 1–1 draw against Iran. Scotland had not even scouted Iran. The disconsolate mood of the nation was reflected by footage of Ally MacLeod in the dugout with his head in his hands. MacLeod had made strange selection choices, picking inexperienced full-backs and retaining the out-of-form Bruce Rioch and Don Masson.

After taking a single point from their opening two games, Scotland had to defeat the Netherlands by three clear goals to progress. Despite the Dutch taking the lead, Scotland fought back to win 3–2 with a goal from Kenny Dalglish and two from Archie Gemmill, the second of which is considered one of the greatest World Cup goals ever; Gemmill beat three Dutch defenders before lifting the ball over goalkeeper Jan Jongbloed into the net. The victory was not sufficient to secure a place in the second round, however, as Scotland were eliminated on goal difference for the second successive World Cup. This performance against strong opponents only heightened the frustration at the poor results earlier in the competition. MacLeod initially retained his position, but resigned later that year.

1980s
Jock Stein, who had won nine consecutive Scottish league titles and the European Cup as manager of Celtic, was appointed Scotland manager in 1978. After failing to qualify for the 1980 European Championship, Scotland qualified for the 1982 FIFA World Cup from a tough group including Sweden, Portugal, Israel and Northern Ireland, losing just one match in the process. They were then drawn in a "Group of death" with New Zealand, Brazil and the Soviet Union. Scotland beat New Zealand by 5–2 in their first game, but then lost 4–1 to a Brazil team containing Socrates, Zico, Eder and Falcão. Scotland were again eliminated on goal difference, after a 2–2 draw with the Soviet Union. This match is best remembered for defenders Alan Hansen and Willie Miller colliding while chasing a long ball, which allowed the Soviets to run through and score.

Scotland qualified for the 1986 FIFA World Cup, their fourth in succession, in traumatic circumstances. The squad went into their last qualification match against Wales needing a point to progress to a qualifying playoff against Australia. With only nine minutes remaining and Wales leading 1–0, Scotland were awarded a penalty kick, which was calmly scored by Davie Cooper. The 1–1 draw meant that Scotland progressed, but as the players and fans celebrated, national coach Jock Stein suffered a heart attack and died shortly afterwards. His assistant Alex Ferguson took over. Scotland qualified by winning 2–0 against Australia in a two-leg playoff, but were again drawn into a group of death, this time with Uruguay, Denmark and West Germany. Scotland were eliminated from the tournament with just one point from their three matches, a goalless draw with Uruguay.

1990s
Now managed by Andy Roxburgh, Scotland qualified for their fifth consecutive World Cup in 1990 by finishing second in their qualifying group behind Yugoslavia and ahead of France. In the finals they were drawn in a group with Costa Rica, Sweden, and Brazil, but the Scots lost 1–0 to Costa Rica in their opening match. While they recovered to beat Sweden 2–1 in their second game, they lost to Brazil in their third match 1–0 and were once again eliminated after the first round. Goalkeeper Jim Leighton fumbled a shot that allowed Brazil to score the only goal.

Scotland failed to qualify for the 1994 FIFA World Cup. The team finished fourth in their qualifying group behind Italy, Switzerland and Portugal. When it became clear that Scotland could not qualify, Andy Roxburgh resigned from his position as team manager.

Craig Brown guided Scotland to qualification for the 1998 FIFA World Cup, finishing as the best runners-up. Scotland were drawn against holders Brazil in the opening game of the World Cup. John Collins scored from the penalty spot to level the score at 1–1, but a Tom Boyd own goal led to a 2–1 defeat. Scotland drew their next game 1–1 with Norway in Bordeaux, but the final match against Morocco ended in a 3–0 defeat. Scotland have not appeared at the World Cup since.

2000s

Scotland failed to qualify for the 2002 FIFA World Cup, finishing third in their qualifying group behind Croatia and Belgium. Craig Brown to resigned after the final qualifying match.

The SFA then appointed the first foreign manager of Scotland, former Germany manager Berti Vogts. Poor results in friendly matches and a bad start to 2006 FIFA World Cup qualification caused the team to drop to a record low of 77th in the FIFA World Rankings. Vogts announced his resignation in 2004, blaming the hostile media for his departure. Walter Smith was brought in to replace Vogts and some improved results followed, but the team finished third in their group behind Italy and Norway and failed to qualify.

2010s
After a narrow failure to qualify for UEFA Euro 2008, George Burley was hired as the new Scotland manager. He was criticised by the media after the team lost their first 2010 FIFA World Cup qualification match against Macedonia. After Scotland lost their fourth match 3–0 to the Netherlands, captain Barry Ferguson and goalkeeper Allan McGregor were excluded from the starting lineup for the following match against Iceland due to a "breach of discipline". Despite winning 2–1 against Iceland, Scotland suffered a terrible 4–0 defeat by Norway in the following qualifier, which left Scotland effectively needing to win their last two games to have a realistic chance of making the qualifying play-offs. Scotland defeated Macedonia 2–0 in the first of those two games, but were eliminated by a 1–0 loss to the Netherlands in the second game. Burley was sacked after a 3–0 friendly defeat by Wales soon afterwards.

Craig Levein replaced Burley, but he left following a poor start to 2014 FIFA World Cup qualification, having taken just two points from four games. Gordon Strachan was appointed Scotland manager in January 2013, but defeats in his first two competitive matches meant that Scotland were the first UEFA team to be mathematically eliminated from the 2014 World Cup. Scotland finished their qualification section by winning three of their last four matches, including two victories against Croatia.

In qualification for the 2018 FIFA World Cup, Scotland were drawn in the same group as England, facing their rivals in a competitive fixture for the first time since 1999. On 11 November 2016, England beat Scotland 3–0 at Wembley. The return match saw Leigh Griffiths score two late free-kicks to give Scotland a 2–1 lead, but Harry Kane scored in added time to force a 2–2 draw. A draw in Slovenia in the final game of the group ended Scottish hopes of a play-off position, and Strachan subsequently left his position by mutual consent.

2020s
Steve Clarke was appointed Scotland manager in May 2019. After qualifying for UEFA Euro 2020, their first major tournament since the 1998 World Cup, Scotland finished second in Group F of 2022 FIFA World Cup qualification. This progressed the team into the play-offs, where they lost 3–1 Ukraine in a semi-final at Hampden.

Statistics

Tournament summary

Matches played

Head to head records

Qualifying

Appearances

Top goalscorers

Squads

See also
Scotland at the UEFA European Championship

References

Sources

External links
 World Cup History, Scottish Football Association
 FIFA Official Ranking of all Participants at Finals 1930–2002. FIFA Match Results for all Stages 1930–2002
 FIFA official site

 
Countries at the FIFA World Cup
World Cup record